In mathematics, the Dickson polynomials, denoted , form a polynomial sequence introduced by .

Over the complex numbers, Dickson polynomials are essentially equivalent to Chebyshev polynomials with a change of variable, and, in fact, Dickson polynomials are sometimes called Chebyshev polynomials.

Dickson polynomials are generally studied over finite fields, where they sometimes may not be equivalent to Chebyshev polynomials.  One of the main reasons for interest in them is that for fixed , they give many examples of permutation polynomials; polynomials acting as permutations of finite fields.

Definition

First kind

The first few Dickson polynomials are

The coefficients are given at several places in the OEIS with minute differences for the first two terms.

Second kind
The  Dickson polynomials of the second kind, are defined by

They have not been studied much, and have properties similar to those of Dickson polynomials of the first kind.
The first few Dickson polynomials  of the second kind are

The coefficients are also given in the OEIS.

Properties
The  are the unique monic polynomials satisfying the functional equation

They also satisfy a composition rule,

The  also satisfy a functional equation

The Dickson polynomial  is a solution of the ordinary differential equation

and the Dickson polynomial  is a  solution of the differential equation

Their ordinary generating functions are

Links to other polynomials 
By the recurrence relation above, Dickson polynomials are Lucas sequences.

By the composition rule above, when α is idempotent, composition of Dickson polynomials of the first kind is commutative.
 The Dickson polynomials with parameter  give monomials.

 The Dickson polynomials with parameter  are related to Chebyshev polynomials  of the first kind by

 Since the Dickson polynomial  can be defined over rings with additional idempotents,  is often not related to a Chebyshev polynomial.

Permutation polynomials and Dickson polynomials
A permutation polynomial (for a given finite field) is one that acts as a permutation of the elements of the finite field.

 proved that any integral polynomial that is a permutation polynomial for infinitely many prime fields is a composition of Dickson polynomials and linear polynomials (with rational coefficients). This assertion has become known as Schur's conjecture, although in fact Schur did not make this conjecture.

Generalization
Dickson polynomials of both kinds over finite fields can be thought of as initial members of a sequence of generalized Dickson polynomials referred to as Dickson polynomials of the th kind.

and

The significant properties of the Dickson polynomials also generalize:
Recurrence relation: For ,

Functional equation:

where , .
Generating function:

Notes

References

  

 

Polynomials